Joseph William Pate (June 6, 1892 – December 26, 1948) was a professional baseball player.  He was a left-handed pitcher over parts of two seasons (1926–1927) with the Philadelphia Athletics.  For his career, he compiled a 9-3 record, with a 3.51 earned run average, 12 saves, and 38 strikeouts in  innings pitched.

An alumnus of Tulane University, he was born in Alice, Texas and died in Fort Worth, Texas at the age of 56.

External links

1892 births
1948 deaths
Philadelphia Athletics players
Major League Baseball pitchers
Baseball players from Texas
Dallas Giants players
Charleston Sea Gulls players
Fort Worth Panthers players
Wichita Witches players
Colorado Springs Millionaires players
Minneapolis Millers (baseball) players
El Paso Texans players
Birmingham Barons players
Shreveport Sports players
York White Roses players
Allentown Buffaloes players
Tulane University alumni